King's Highway 89, commonly referred to as Highway 89, is an east–west provincially maintained highway in the south central portion of the Canadian province of Ontario, stretching  from the junction of Highway 9 and Highway 23 in Harriston in the west, to Highway 400 just east of Cookstown in the east. The principal urban centres along the highway include Alliston, Shelburne and Mount Forest. Outside these towns, the highway travels through rural farmland across a large part of southwestern Ontario.

Highway 89 was established in 1937 as a result of the rerouting of Highway 9 between Orangeville and Highway 27. In 1963, the route was extended west to Palmerston and east to Highway 400. Plans were conceived during the late 1970s to push the highway further east to Highway 12 via Ravenshoe Road, resulting in a brief extension to Highway 11. However, environmental protest over the chosen route through the Holland Marsh resulted in the cancellation of plans in 1986. In 1997, the section between Highway 400 and Highway 11 was decommissioned. The most recent change to the route took place in 2003, when the section of Highway 89 between Palmerston and Harriston was renumbered as part of Highway 23, creating a shared terminus at a junction with Highway 9.

Route description 
The route forms the main streets of several of the small towns that dot the highway east to west, namely Cookstown, Alliston and Shelburne.  The highway also forms the backbone of many small villages and hamlets between the larger centres, such as Conn, Keldon, Primrose, Violet Hill, Rosemont and Nicolston.

The highway formerly continued past its current eastern terminus at Highway 400 to Yonge Street, formerly Highway 11, in the hamlet of Fennell.  This section is now numbered as Simcoe County Road 89. East of Fennel, the roadway continues as Simcoe County Road 3 / Shore Acres Drive.  The highway also continued past its current western terminus in Harriston, taking the route to Palmerston that is now numbered as Highway 23.

The highway mostly runs through farmland and small communities, although the route does pass by Earl Rowe Provincial Park and the Honda car manufacturing plant in the Alliston area.  Other parks and natural areas that are close to the route are Boyne Valley Provincial Park and Mono Cliffs Provincial Park, both of which are located on the Niagara Escarpment. Further west is the Luther Marsh Conservation Area, a vast wilderness area that surrounds Luther Lake.

History 
Highway 89 was created out of a highway rerouting in the late 1930s. Originally, it formed the routing of Highway 9, which until then turned north at Orangeville, travelling concurrently with Highway 10, then turning east to Cookstown. On February 10, 1937, Highway 9 was rerouted along its present course east of Orangeville.
By 1938, Highway 89 was designated along the former route of Highway 9.

Highway 89 remained as-is until the early 1960s, when it was extended west to Palmerston and east to Highway 400. On April 1, 1963, the highway was assumed through the counties of Dufferin, Grey and Wellington.
The section between Highway 27 and Highway 400 was assumed the following day.

During the mid-1970s, Highway 89 was extended east to Highway 11 at Fennell. This section was eventually returned to the jurisdiction of Simcoe County on April 1, 1997.
During the spring of 2003, the MTO renumbered several highways to improve route continuity. Among these was the renumbering of a section of Highway 89 between Harriston and Palmerston.
The result of this renumbering was a shared terminus between Highway 89 and Highway 23 at an intersection with Highway 9.

Extension to Highway 12 
During the late 1970s, plans arose to create a new highway link on the south side of Lake Simcoe to connect Highway 400 and Highway 12. The route for this extension was announced on June 30, 1978. It was to follow 11th Line from Highway 400 east to the Holland Marsh, where it would cross towards the northeast onto the alignment of Ravenshoe Road (York Road 32). The extension would traverse the length of Ravenshoe Road to Lakeridge Road (Durham Road 23), where it would zig-zag onto Concession Road 7 to end immediately north of Sunderland.
However, heavy environmental protests ensued over the chosen route through the marsh. Consequently, then Transportation Minister Ed Fulton officially cancelled the extension on April 21, 1986.
The proposal has since been reborn as the Bradford Bypass.

Major intersections

References

External links 

Highway 89 at OntHighways.com

089